The Journal of Medical Virology is a monthly peer-reviewed medical journal covering fundamental and applied research concerning viruses which affect humans. It is published by Wiley-Blackwell and was established in 1977. The current editor-in-chief is Shou-Jiang (SJ) Gao (University of Pittsburgh Medical Center (UPMC) Hillman Cancer Center Cancer Virology Program).

Abstracting and indexing 
The journal is abstracted and indexed in:

According to the Journal Citation Reports, the journal has a 2021 impact factor of 20.693, ranking it 2nd out of 37 journals in the "Virology" category.

References

External links 
 

Monthly journals
Wiley-Blackwell academic journals
Publications established in 1977
English-language journals
Virology journals